Roshtkhar County is in Razavi Khorasan province, Iran. The capital of the county is the city of Roshtkhar. At the 2006 census, the county's population was 57,247 in 13,519 households. The following census in 2011 counted 60,632 people in 16,262 households. At the 2016 census, the county's population was 60,689 in 17,566 households.

Administrative divisions

The population history of Roshtkhar County's administrative divisions over three consecutive censuses is shown in the following table. The latest census shows two districts, four rural districts, and two cities.

References

 

Counties of Razavi Khorasan Province